Volleyball has been in the South American Games event since the first inaugural edition in 1978 in La Paz, Bolivia but cancelled later in the third edition in Santiago, Chile 1986 South American Games then return since the 2010 South American Games in Medellín, Colombia.

Indoor Volleyball

Men's tournaments

Summaries 

 A round-robin tournament determined the final standings.

Medal summary

Women's tournaments

Summaries 

 A round-robin tournament determined the final standings.

Medal summary

References

External links 
 ODESUR official website 

 
Sports at the South American Games
South American Games
Volleyball competitions in South America